Fernando Daniel Martínez (born 18 July 1991) is an Argentine boxer who has held the IBF super flyweight title since 2022.

Amateur career
He competed in the men's flyweight event at the 2016 Summer Olympics.

Professional career

Early career
Martínez made his professional debut against Juan Ignacio Haran on 25 August 2017. He won the fight by a fourth-round stoppage. Martínez amassed a 10–0 record during the next two years, with six victories coming by way of stoppage.

Martínez had his first step-up fight on 16 December 2019, as he was scheduled to challenge the reigning WBC Silver super flyweight champion Athenkosi Dumezweni. The bout took place in East London, Eastern Cape in South Africa, and was as such Martínez's first outside of Argentina. He won the fight by an upset eleventh-round technical knockout, stopping Dumezweni with a flurry of punches at the 0:23 minute mark.

Martínez next faced Angel Nicolas Aquino on 11 December 2020, at the Estadio Mary Terán de Weiss in Buenos Aires, Argentina. He won the closely contested bout by split decision, with scores of 95–94, 97–92 and 94–95.

Martínez faced Gonzalo Garcia Duran in a stay-busy fight on 13 August 2021, at the Hotel Atlantis The Palm in Dubai. He won the fight by a fourth-round technical knockout, stopping Duran with eight seconds left in the round.

IBF super flyweight champion

Martínez vs Ancajas
Martínez was booked to challenge the reigning IBF super flyweight champion Jerwin Ancajas on 26 February 2022, in what was Ancajas' tenth title defense. The title fight was scheduled for the undercard of the Chris Colbert and Hector Garcia WBA super featherweight bout, which took place at the Cosmopolitan in Las Vegas, Nevada. Despite entering the fight as the underdog, Martínez captured the title by an upset unanimous decision. One judge scored the fight 117–111 in his favor, while the remaining two judges awarded him a 118–110 scorecard. Martínez landed 427 out of 1046 total punches thrown, while Ancajas landed 192 out of 816 total punches.

Martínez vs Ancajas II
On 22 July 2022, it was revealed that Ancajas had invoked his rematch clause. As such, Martínez was booked to face Jerwin Ancajas in an immediate rematch in his first championship defense, which took place on 8 October 2022, at the Home Depot Center in Carson, California. The bout was scheduled for the undercard of the Sebastian Fundora and Carlos Ocampo interim WBC middleweight title bout. He retained the title by unanimous decision, with two scorecards of 118–110 and one scorecard of 119–109.

Martínez vs Bornea
On December 16, 2022, the IBF formally ordered Martínez to make a mandatory title defense against Jade Bornea. As the pair failed to reach terms, a purse bid was called for January 17, 2023, which was postponed to allow for further negotiations, but eventually rescheduled for February 14 and won by TGB Promotions with a bid of $25,000.

Professional boxing record

See also
 List of world super-flyweight boxing champions
 List of current world boxing champions

References

External links

Fernando Martínez - Profile, News Archive & Current Rankings at Box.Live

 

1991 births
Living people
Argentine male boxers
Olympic boxers of Argentina
Boxers at the 2016 Summer Olympics
South American Games bronze medalists for Argentina
South American Games medalists in boxing
Competitors at the 2010 South American Games
World super-flyweight boxing champions
International Boxing Federation champions
Sportspeople from Avellaneda